Chhindwara Railway Station serves Chhindwara in Chhindwara district in the Indian state of Madhya Pradesh.

History
Chhindwara was part of the Satpura Railway. It was connected with Nainpur, the focal point of the narrow-gauge railway, in 1904. The Chhindwara–Pench Coalfield line came up in 1906–07.

Gauge conversion
The -long Nagpur–Chhindwara section and the -long Chhindwara–Nainpur–Mandla section are amongst the approved gauge conversion projects. These projects are getting delayed because of funds crunch.

Survey of new rail line Chhindwara–Kareli–Sagour rail line is in progress. This will help in connecting villages of Chhindwara, Narsinghpur and Sagar districts and help in the development of Satpura, Mahakaushal and Bundelkhand area respectively as a whole. This will provide and alternative north–south route via Lalitpur–Sagar–Narsinghpur–Chhindwara–Nagpur route alternative to Bina–Bhopal–Itarsi–Amla–Betul–Nagpur route thereby decreasing the distance between north and south by nearly 300 km. Kareli railway station will serve as an alternative to Itarsi Junction. This railway line will help in connecting Itarsi–Narsinghpur–Jabalpur–Katni stretch and Itarsi–Bhopal–Bina–Saugor–Katni stretch of West Central Railways. Recently CCEA also sanctioned Gadarwara-Indore new rail line via Budni. These two rail lines in combination will reduce the distance of the state's financial capital Indore from District like Jabalpur, Narsinghpur, Hoshangabad, Sagar, Chhindwara which will help in industrial and economic development of these regions"

Electrification
As of 2012, electrification of the Amla–Chhindwara section is completed in March 2018

Services
Trains departing from the Chhindwara Junction railway station are:
Panchvalley Express
Patalkot Express

Railway Colony
The Chhindwara section in Nagpur division being one of the highest earning sections in the South East Central Railway.

The Railway Colony comprises Ward Numbers 4 & 5. The colony covers a big part of Chhindwara city, located in the South-Eastern side of the NH-69A. The colony was established during the British Era, it is a well-planned township with proper sanitation and electric facility. The colony is well decorated and maintained. All the Railway establishments are present here. There are about one thousand staff quarters. The entire colony is further divided into different colonies such as the AEN Office & Colony, Loco Colony, Running Staff Colony, Driver's Colony and Doubling Colony etc.

All type of Railway amenities like Running Room, Railway School, Railway Hospitals, RPF Barrack, Govt. Railway Police Station, The Railway Power Grid and other electric substations, ATM counters, Railway Children's Parks have been facilitate.

There is an Institute, the Railway Institute, from the British time, which were used as theaters and recreation clubs by the Britishers. These are now used for marriage and other parties and cultural programs.

There are facilities like Auditorium, Indoor Badminton Court, Table Tennis Court, Chess Court, Carrom board Room, Gym, Volleyball Court and Library etc. Chess & Carrom have become very popular games in this area, there after many kids & adults from here participated and won in different levels.

Railway has organized different tournaments in Cricket, Carrom, Badminton, Chess, Volleyball time to time to motivate the railway employees, their family members as well as other residential of Chhindwara city.

The religious institution includes Maa Annapurna Temple in Loco Colony, Durga Puja Mandap of Bengali Association, Ganesh Puja Mandap near Hospital, The Hanuman Mandir of Station etc.
The Bengali Association was established in 1943, till then mainly it observes the Durga Puja, followed by Lakshmi, Saraswati and Kali Pujas, it is the oldest Durga Puja of the town, idol-makers from Kumartoli-Kolkata used to come and prepare the idols. Apart from Religious it also serves as a Social Organization, it observes the occasions like the Bengali New Year, Birth and Death Anniversary of famous personalities, like Rabindranath Tagore, Vivekananda, Ramkrishna Paramhamsa etc.

The Railways management is looking to further beautification of railway surrounding areas in future.

Apart from these, Railway Station area is the place where, daily in evening thousands of public has come for daily recreations, public meetings, get-togethers, discussion on social as well as competitional matters.

References

External links
 Chhindwara Train Route

Railway stations in Chhindwara district
Chhindwara
Railway stations opened in 1904
Nagpur SEC railway division
Amla-Chhindwara rail line